The Church of São Pedro is a 17th-century church located in the civil parish of Ponta Delgada in the municipality of Santa Cruz das Flores, in the Portuguese island of Flores, in the archipelago of the Azores.

History

The primitive temple was raised at the end of the 16th century, in what was then known as the Hermitage of Santa Ana, from the indications of the chronicler Gaspar Frutuoso. Today, this structure has disappeared.

By 1571, a parochial church existed in the parish, from the writings of friar Diogo das Chagas. Similar writings from Father António Cordeiro indicated that the parish supported little more than 150 homes.

But, by the 17th century, friar Agostinho de Montalverne indicated that this number had decreased to 150 homes, supporting a population of 650 inhabitants.

The work on rebuilding the parochial church began in 1763, in the land occupied by a small hermitage to the same invocation. The principal promoter of the construction was Father Francisco de Fraga e Almeida, a man of great fortune, old vicar and Ouvidor for the islands of Flores and Corvo. In 1764, he left behind a testament of 100$000 to the Confraria de São Pedro (Brotherhood of St. Peter) with an obligation to celebrate a mass for his soul, on the day of its inauguration. By 1774, work was preceding slowly, and the retables were only being completed at the time. There is no indication associated with its completion.

Between 1971 and 1975, restoration work on the original foundation and interiors were undertaken.

Architecture
The single-nave church is implanted on a level courtyard, elevated in relation to the road and accessible by six steps in the front facade. It includes a nave a narrower presbytery, two sacristies (on the back of the lateral walls to the nave), belltower (left of the facade) and baptistery (on the lateral left wall). It is constructed in masonry stone, plastered and painted in white, except the soclo, cornerstones and frames of the windows, cornices, triumphal arch, pulpit and some decorate elements.

The principal facade is framed by soclo with stonework and decorated with cornice where the triangular frontispiece sits, marked by an axial doorway and two windows at the level of the high-choir. The soclo and cornice encircle the buildings spaces. The door, with triple lintel, has pilasters flanking the framed entranceway with pedestals and capitals. Over the capitals are corbels that frame the upper lintel and support the cornice. Over the cornice is a triangular apex flanked by pinnacles and over this a cartouche inscribed with:
REEDIFICADA / Po-P VIGARIO / FRANCISCO DE FRAGA E ALdo m / ANNO 1763
Rebuilt /by Father Vicar / Francisco de Fraga e Almeida / Year 1763
The inscription is flanked by scrolls and surmounted by a stone with the sculpted symbols of St. Peter in bas-relief. The windows on the front facade have panels and triple lintels, meanwhile the intermediary cornice, the lintel and upper cornice are integrated with a pronounced relief. Above the windows, the frontispiece includes a circular oculus in the tympanum, surmounted by cross.

On the left is the bell tower which is divided into two levels by a cornice that circles it. The upper portion of the lower level includes a frieze surmounted by cross, while on the lower section is a lateral doorway with arch. The second level includes rounded arches on each face of the belfry, and the tower surmounted by a semi-spherical cupola with pinnacle. The lateral doors to the nave and accessways to the sacristy have double-lintels and cornices, while the epistole-side sacristy is marked by two pinnacles over the extremes of the cornice.

The principal entrance to the church is protected by a wooden windbreak, surmounted by the high-choir supported by two pilasters in wood and corbels on the lateral walls. The front of the high-choir includes a curvilinear wooden guardrail and balustrade. The whole group is accessible by a wooden "L"-shaped staircase on the side of the epistole, while a small doorway opposite the epistole provides access to the belfry.

Opposite the epistole and following the choir, is an arched doorway over posts, protected by a wooden grade, that provides entrance to the baptistery. On the top of the grade are two scrolls that catch a circular element, surmounted by cross, with the inscription:
CONFITEOR / UNUM BAPTISMA / IN REMISSIONEM / PECCATORUM
Confess / One Baptism / The Forgiveness / Sins
In the middle of the nave, on each lateral walls are doors that communicated with the exterior, surmounted by windows. Opposite the epistole is a door to the pulpit, supported by a wood guardrails over a corbel.

Before the triumphal arch, on either side of the nave, is a door to each of the sacristies. The door to the pulpit, much like sacristies, have double lintels surmounted by a cornice, with the sacristy doors further surmounted by niche with flanked pinnacles. In the interior of the sacristy to the left, is a wood staircase that connects it to the pulpit and upper storage area. On either side of the presbytery are two retables place in 45 degree angles. The main altar with window on the either side, next to the retables, is decorated in a Revivalist-style  (or even Rococo) consisting of gilded woodwork. The ceiling of the nave, main chapel and baptistery are in wood, simulating vaulted ceilings, with a large cornice at the base of the nave's ceiling.

References

Notes

Sources
 
 

Sao Pedro
Church Sao Pedro